The 2013 Qatar Crown Prince Cup was the 19th edition of the Qatar Crown Prince Cup and took place from April 27 to May 4. The competition was contested by the top four finishers in the 2012–13 Qatar Stars League.

2013 Participants
 Al-Sadd : 2012–13 Qatar Stars League champions
 Lekhwiya : 2012–13 Qatar Stars League runner up
 El Jaish : 2012–13 Qatar Stars League 3rd place
 Al Rayyan : 2012–13 Qatar Stars League 4th place

Bracket

References

Qatar Crown Prince Cup
Qatar Crown Prince Cup
Crown Prince Cup